Énrí Ó Muirgheasa (Henry Morris) (14 January 1874 – 13 August 1945), was an Irish civil servant, Irish language scholar, folklore collector, historian and writer.

Early life and family
Ó Muirgheasa was born in Cashlan East, Lisdoonan, Donaghmoyne, County Monaghan on 14 January 1874. He was a son of Lúcas Ó Muirgheasa, a farmer, and Máire Nic Ward. He attended Lisdoonan school but learned to read and write Irish from his granduncle, Proinsias Ó Conghaile.

Ó Muirgheasa married harpist and fellow teacher, Eibhlín Ní Raghallaigh (Helen O'Reilley) of Dundalk in 1906. Their son, Colum, was born and died in 1907. Eibhlín died in 1908. In 1912, he remarried to Máire Woods from County Galway. Ó Muirgheasa died on 13 August 1945 in Strabane.

Career
He was appointed monitor at Lisdoonan school in 1888, where he established the first Monaghan branch of the Gaelic League. Ó Muirgheasa graduated as a teacher from St. Patrick's College, Drumcondra, in 1900, obtaining a teaching post at St. Malachy's, Dundalk, in 1901, where he was one of the founders of the Louth Historical and Archaeological Society in 1903. Ó Muirgheasa moved to Strabane, County Tyrone in 1907, where he organised the teaching of Irish in schools. He moved to Derry in 1912, and then became a school inspector in Skerries. In 1923, he was appointed a divisional inspector in Sligo, becoming deputy chief inspector in 1932.

His writings were published widely in both journals and newspapers.

Bibliography
 Greann na Gaedhilge, 1901
 Seanfhocla Uladh, 1907
 Ceithearnach Ui Dhomhnaill, 1912
 Cead de Cheoltaibh Uladh, 1915
  Abhráin Airt Mhic Chubhthaigh, 1916
 Oíche áirneáil i dTír Chonaill, 1924
 Amhrán na Midhe, 1933 
 Dánta Diadha Uladh, 1936
 Amhráin na Midhe le hÉnrí Ó Muirgheasa, Lesa Ní Mhunghaile, Navan, Meath Archaeological and Historical Society, 2015

References

External links
Biography from Ainm.ie in Irish
Ó Muirgheasa's entry on CODECS
Ó Muirgheasa's collection in the National Library of Ireland

1874 births
1945 deaths
20th-century Irish writers
People from County Monaghan
People from County Louth
Linguists from Ireland
Irish-language writers
Irish civil servants
Irish folklorists
Alumni of St Patrick's College, Dublin